Clinton School District is a public school district based in Clinton, Arkansas, United States. The district provides early childhood, elementary and secondary education for more than 1,400 prekindergarten through grade 12 students.

The district serves the following: Clinton, most of Dennard, Scotland, and Alread. Clinton School District is accredited by the Arkansas Department of Education (ADE).

History
Formalized education in Clinton began in 1879 with the start of the Clinton Male and Female Academy.

On July 1, 2004, the Alread School District and the Scotland School District consolidated into the existing Clinton school district.

Schools 
Secondary schools:
 Clinton High School—serving approximately 300 students in grades 10 through 12.
 Clinton Junior High School—serving approximately 300 students in grades 7 through 9.

Elementary schools:
 Clinton Intermediate School—serving approximately 300 students in grades 4 through 6.
 Cowsert Elementary School—serving approximately 500 students in pre-kindergarten through grade 3.

Former schools:
 Alread High School (closed 2007) 
 Scotland High School (closed 2007)

References

Further reading
These include maps of predecessor districts:
 (Download)

External links 
 

School districts in Arkansas
Education in Van Buren County, Arkansas
Education in Pope County, Arkansas
Education in Conway County, Arkansas
School districts established in 1879
1879 establishments in Arkansas